Harbans Lal Gupta was an Indian freedom fighter and Indian politician. He was one of the founder leaders of the Praja Mandal Movement in undivided Punjab before Independence and was detained by the British during the Quit India Movement. He was the father of Anupam Gupta.

References 

1910s births
2013 deaths
Speakers of the Punjab Legislative Assembly
Indian National Congress politicians
Punjab, India MLAs 1952–1957
Punjab, India MLAs 1957–1962
Punjab, India MLAs 1962–1967
Indian National Congress politicians from Punjab, India